Sitamau State was a princely state of the British Raj before 1947. Its capital was in Sitamau town, Mandsaur district, Madhya Pradesh. The total area of the state was 350 square miles. The average revenue of the state was Rs.130,000.

History
Ratan Singh Rathore was killed in the battle of Dharmat, after which his descendants continued to rule Ratlam. During Raja Keshodas's reign some soldiers of the Raja killed the Jaziya tax collectors due to which the Mughals completely annexed Ratlam. Keshodas stuck to imperial service during this time and on 3rd September 1699, he was made the faujdar of Nalgunda. Due to his good governance, Aurangzeb later granted Keshodas the Pargana of Titrod from which Raja Keshodas founded Sitamau State on 31st October 1701. The State of Ratlam was restored to an uncle of Keshodas called Chattrasal in 1705. In 1714 the emperor Farrukhsiyar further added the paragana of Alot to the new state. Sitamau faced invasions after the decline of the Mughal Empire. Nahargarh was captured by Gwalior State and Alot by Dewas State. This forced the rulers of Sitamau to seek the help of John Malcolm who formed a treaty between Gwalior and Sitamau, through which Sitamau paid a yearly tribute of Rs.33,000 to Gwalior and Scindia in return promised not to show hostility towards Sitamau. This tribute was later reduced to Rs.27,000.

Rulers
The rulers were Ratanawat Rathor Rajputs and descendants of Ratan Singh Rathore.

Rajas 
  1701 – 1748                Kesho Das 
  1748 – 1752                Gaj Singh 
  1752 – 1802                Fateh Singh 
  1802 – 1867                Raj Ram Singh I                    (d. 1867), One of the Longest-Reigning monarchs in History
  1867 – 28 May 1885         Bhawani Singh                      (b. 1836 – d. 1885) 
8 Dec 1885 – 1899         Bahadur Singh    
  1899 –  9 May 1900         Shardul Singh 
11 May 1900 – 15 August 1947  Raj Ram Singh II                   (b. 1880 – d. 1967) (from 11 December 1911, Sir Raj Ram Singh II)

See also
Malwa Agency

References

Princely states of India
Princely states of Madhya Pradesh
1701 establishments in India
1948 disestablishments in India
States and territories disestablished in 1948
States and territories established in 1701
Rajputs
Rathores
Mandsaur district